The canton of Riom-ès-Montagnes is an administrative division of the Cantal department, southern France. Its borders were modified at the French canton reorganisation which came into effect in March 2015. Its seat is in Riom-ès-Montagnes.

It consists of the following communes:
 
Apchon
Auzers
Chanterelle
Collandres
Condat
Le Falgoux
Lugarde
Marcenat
Marchastel
Méallet
Menet
Montboudif
Montgreleix
Moussages
Riom-ès-Montagnes
Saint-Amandin
Saint-Bonnet-de-Condat
Saint-Étienne-de-Chomeil
Saint-Hippolyte
Saint-Vincent-de-Salers
Trizac
Valette
Le Vaulmier

References

Cantons of Cantal